The women's 1500 metres at the 1986 Asian Winter Games was held on 2 March 1986 in Sapporo, Japan.

Records

Results

References
Results

External links
Changchun 2007 Official website

Women 1500